Marilyn Bendell (September 19, 1921 – May 18, 2003) was an American impressionist painter.

Life
She was born in Grand Ledge, Michigan.  She was training to become a concert pianist, but at age 17, decided to pursue painting instead.  
She studied painting at the American Academy of Art in Chicago and privately with Arnold E. Turtle (1892–1954). She became an artist member of the Chicago Galleries Association, and was elected a Fellow of the Royal Society for the Encouragement of the Arts in 1965.

About 1960, she moved to Longboat Key, Florida, where she ran an art school on Cortez Road with her husband George Burrows.  She painted figural compositions, still lifes, and abstract compositions.

Her final move was to Nambé Pueblo, New Mexico (20 miles from Santa Fe) in 1983, where she continued to give private instruction until 1993.  Thereafter, she pursued painting exclusively, until her death on May 18, 2003 at age 81.  Her New Mexico oeuvre consists primarily of impressionistic paintings of Native Americans and other women.  Her paintings are generally signed "Bendell" without a date.

Her son and student, David Hyams, is also a painter of the Santa Fe School.

Footnotes

References
 Art of the West, Art of the West Guidebook of Western Artists, 2001 Edition, Minnetonka, MN, Art of the West Magazine, p. 88.
 Collins, Jim L., Women Artists in America: Eighteenth Century to Present, Chattanooga, Tennessee, 1973, p. 426.
 Falk, Peter Hastings (Editor) Who Was Who in American Art, 1564-1975, New Providence, NJ, Marquis Who's Who, 1999, p. 3724.
 McGowan, Alison C. (Editor), Who's Who in American Art, 25th Edition, New Providence, NJ, Marquis Who's Who, 2004, p. 1512.
 Southwest Art, In memoriam, September 1, 2003.

External links
 Marilyn Bendell on Artnet
 Marilyn Bendell in AskART

Artists from Florida
American Impressionist painters
Painters from New Mexico
Painters from Michigan
Artists of the American West
1921 births
2003 deaths
20th-century American painters
21st-century American painters
American women painters
20th-century American women artists
21st-century American women artists
People from Grand Ledge, Michigan
People from Longboat Key, Florida
People from Nambé Pueblo, New Mexico